A gubernatorial election was held on 23 April 1955 to elect the Governor of Hokkaido Prefecture.

Candidates
Toshibumi Tanaka - incumbent governor of Hokkaido Prefecture, age 43.
, age 52.

Results

Hokkaido gubernational elections
1955 elections in Japan